The Men's keirin event of the 2016 UCI Track Cycling World Championships was held on 6 March 2016. Joachim Eilers of Germany won the gold medal.

Results

First round
The first round was held at 11:00.

Heat 1

Heat 2

Heat 3

Heat 4

First round repechage
The first round repechage was held at 12:00.

Heat 1

Heat 2

Heat 3

Heat 4

Second round
The second round was started at 14:16.

Heat 1

Heat 2

Finals
The finals were started at 15:47.

Small final

Final

References

Men's keirin
UCI Track Cycling World Championships – Men's keirin